King Ralph is a 1991 American comedy film written and directed by David S. Ward and starring John Goodman, Peter O'Toole, and John Hurt. The film is about an American who becomes the unlikely King of the United Kingdom after an electrical accident wipes out the British Royal Family.

The story is loosely based on the 1980 novel Headlong by Emlyn Williams. Very little of the story survived the transition to the screen; characters were changed and the story made into a comedy. The film was a minor box office hit but was received negatively by critics.

Plot
The entire British Royal Family is electrocuted and killed in a freak accident outside Buckingham Palace while having a royal portrait taken. Sir Cedric Willingham leads a search for any surviving heirs to whom to pass the crown. After days of searching, a living heir is found: American Ralph Jones.

Shortly after being fired from his job as a lounge singer in Las Vegas, Ralph is informed by Cedric's assistant secretary Duncan Phipps that he has royal blood. His grandmother Constance had a brief encounter with the first Duke of Warren while a hotel waitress in the US. A ring is given as proof, a duplicate of the ring she used to wear that the Duke had given her.

Ralph is flown to London, where Cedric gives him a crash course on royal etiquette. On only his second day, he goes to a strip club and meets Miranda Greene, an out-of-luck exotic dancer and aspiring fashion designer. He dares her to go out on a date with him if the British press proves his claim to the monarchy. Meanwhile, Lord Percival Graves is opposed to having an American on the throne and proposes to declare the reigning House of Wyndham at an end and replace it with the House of Stuart, of which he is patriarch. Prime Minister Geoffrey Hale states that Ralph's succession is legitimate unless he commits a grievous error. With this in mind, Graves bribes Miranda to stir up controversy by having a public relationship with Ralph. Despite warnings by Cedric not to commit a mistake similar to that of King Edward VIII, Ralph sneaks out of the Palace to have a date with Miranda in Hyde Park. The next day, she returns Graves' money, but he already has photographs of her with Ralph. To preserve Ralph's reputation, Miranda breaks up with him.

Despite Ralph's reluctance to accept British culture and his ineptness in formal affairs, he makes a positive impression on King Mulambon  of Zambezi during his state visit. They share concerns about the role of leadership they have assumed and the economic interests of their nations. Ralph accumulates a small but loyal following.

It is arranged for Ralph to marry Princess Anna of Finland to continue the royal bloodline and guarantee jobs for the UK in Finland's newly discovered oil reserves in the Baltic. On the night of the Finnish Royal Family's visit, Ralph is turned off by Princess Anna's unusually deep voice, her bizarre sexual preferences, and her nonchalant acceptance of arranged royal marriage. Miranda attends the royal ball as a set-up by Graves, and photos of her kiss with Ralph are shown to Anna's father King Gustav which, along with Ralph's wild performance of "Good Golly, Miss Molly", results in Finland turning down the UK in favor of Japan for the offshore equipment contract.

Ralph accepts a stern rebuke from Cedric and endeavors to set things right. Miranda confesses her role in the scandal and he walks out on her. Becoming suspicious about his situation, Phipps tells Ralph that Cedric is also an heir to the throne (his great-grand-mother, a parlor maid, had a one-night stand with a British prince) but had turned it down.

Ralph addresses Parliament, apologizing for his recent actions and informing the country he has organized with King Mulambon for Zambezi to purchase £200 million worth of British mining equipment and open three car engine plants in Britain, ensuring jobs for Miranda's family and thousands of other Britons. He then reveals Graves has been sabotaging his succession to the throne and has him arrested for violating the Treason Act of 1702. Finally, he announces he will abdicate and reveals Cedric as his successor.

Cedric accepts his duty as king, Ralph is created the third Duke of Warren, with a lucrative annual stipend and his own recording studio in his country estate. Cedric warns Ralph that since he has no children, he may have to be king again after he (Cedric) dies. Ralph marries Miranda and raises his son Ralph II with her while fronting his own singing group, Ralph and the Dukettes. They perform a cover of "Duke of Earl" as the credits roll.

Cast

Production

Filming
King Ralph was shot in various locations in England. Stand-ins for Buckingham Palace include Wrotham Park, Syon House, Somerset House, Harewood House, Old Royal Naval College, Apsley House, Belvoir Castle, Hagley Hall, Lancaster House, and Blenheim Palace. Warwick Castle and Hever Castle were used to substitute the interior shots for Windsor Castle. St Pancras railway station was used to film the scene introducing the Finnish royal family. Highclere Castle was used for Lord Graves' home. Dalton, South Yorkshire, was the location of Miranda's parents' home.

Marketing
Universal Pictures launched a marketing campaign for the film, including a partnership with Burger King valued at US$8 million.

Soundtrack
The film's score was composed by James Newton Howard, while the soundtrack features songs performed by John Goodman:

"Tiny Bubbles"
"Good Golly, Miss Molly"
"Duke of Earl"

Other songs featured in the film include:

"Good Golly, Miss Molly" by Jeff Lynne
"Be-Bop-A-Lula" by Gene Vincent and His Blue Caps
"Moulin Rouge"
"I'm in the Mood for Love"

Reception

Box office
In the US, the film earned $8.3 million in its opening weekend, in third place.
In total, the film grossed $34 million domestically and $52.5 million worldwide against a budget of $23 million.

Critical response
Review aggregation website Rotten Tomatoes gives the film a score of 23% based on reviews from 13 critics, with an average rating of 4.7/10.

Owen Gleiberman of Entertainment Weekly gave the film a C grade, complaining about the entirely predictable jokes, but praising Goodman for his likable performance. Gene Siskel and Roger Ebert of At the Movies gave the film "Two Thumbs Down", with Ebert commenting that "it might have been funnier if John Goodman had played a sleazeball instead of a cuddly nice guy." William Thomas of Empire magazine gave the film two out of five stars, calling it "Poor, even for a 'funny because he's fat' film."

References

External links

 
 
 
 
 
 

1991 films
1991 comedy films
American comedy films
Ralph
Films about royalty
Films based on British novels
Films scored by James Newton Howard
Films set in England
Films set in the Las Vegas Valley
Films set in London
Films set in palaces
Films shot at Pinewood Studios
Films shot in Hampshire
Films shot in Hertfordshire
Films shot in Oxfordshire
Films shot in South Yorkshire
Films shot in Warwickshire
Films shot in Worcestershire
Films with screenplays by David S. Ward
Monarchy in fiction
Universal Pictures films
1990s English-language films
Films directed by David S. Ward
1990s American films